The Port Noarlunga Football Club is an Australian rules football club first formed in 1935. Port Noarlunga initially played a four-season stint in the Glenelg District Football Association before going into recess.

A revived Port Noarlunga club joined the Southern Football Association in 1947 where they have remained since.  The Port Noarlunga FC continues to field teams in Senior and Junior grades in the Southern Football League.

Port Noarlunga FC has produced one Australian Football League (AFL) player, Ryan Fitzgerald, formerly of the Adelaide and Sydney clubs.

A-Grade Premierships
 Southern Football League Division 1 (4)
 1965, 1973, 1985, 1997

Greatest SFL Team 
To celebrate the 125th anniversary of the Southern Football League, each club was asked to name their "Greatest Team" whilst participating in the SFL.

References

External links
 Official site

 
 

Southern Football League (SA) Clubs
Australian rules football clubs in South Australia
1935 establishments in Australia
Australian rules football clubs established in 1936